The  Tasmanian Forests Intergovernmental Agreement (TFIA) is an agreement between the Commonwealth of Australia and the State of Tasmania. It is designed to create additional areas of forest reserves in the State of Tasmania, while ensuring ongoing wood supply for the forest industry.  It was signed by Australian Prime Minister, Julia Gillard, and Tasmania's Premier, Lara Giddings, on August 7, 2011.

Background 
Forestry has long been a contentious issue in Tasmania, which is home to the world's first environmental political party, the Tasmanian Greens, reflecting the high level of environmental awareness in the state.

The Agreement resulted from Round Table discussions in 2010 between the Tasmania’s forest industry and environmental movement, which sought to end more than 30 years of animosity between the parties.

The main driver of the talks was the decision of Tasmania’s largest private forestry company, Gunns Limited, to exit native forest harvesting and focus on developing its proposed plantation-based pulp mill at Bell Bay in the north of the State.  This decision led to a need to restructure the forest industry, and also created an opportunity to reserve additional areas of native forests.

The Round Table discussions culminated in the Tasmanian Forests Statement of Principles to Lead to an Agreement.  The Statement of Principles sought support from the Australian and Tasmanian Governments to protect an additional 430,000 hectares of forests claimed by environmental groups to be of high conservation value, while ensuring a sustainable supply of native forest and plantation timbers to the forest industry.

The TFIA provided a financial package of AUD 277 million to: 
 support logging contractors to leave the industry following the decision of Gunns Limited, to exit native forest harvesting;
 protect and manage new forest reserves;
 fund regional development projects; and
 fund mental health counselling and community wellbeing projects.

The Agreement also established an Independent Verification Group to assess the conservation values and timber supply requirements from within the areas nominated by the environmental movement for additional forest reserves.  All stakeholders involved in the Agreement agreed to the Independent Verification process.

In accordance with Clause 36 of the Agreement, the Commonwealth of Australia, the State of Tasmania and the State-owned forest management corporation, Forestry Tasmania, signed a Conservation Agreement that provided interim protection for the areas of forest under assessment, while allowing Forestry Tasmania to meet is contracted wood supply obligations, until the expected conclusion of the process on 30 June 2012.

Signatories 
The signatories to the Statement of Principles were, in alphabetical order:

 Australian Conservation Foundation
 The Australian Forest Contractors' Association
 The Construction, Forest, Mining and Energy Union
 Environment Tasmania Inc
 The Forest Industries Association of Tasmania
 The National Association of Forestry
 Tasmanian Country Sawmillers' Foundation
 The Tasmanian Forest Contractors' Association
 Timber Communities Australia Ltd
 The Wilderness Society

Current status 
The Independent Verification Group delivered its reports on 23 March 2012.  The purpose of the reports is to provide the environmental and forestry groups involved in the Agreement with the information required to negotiate a final agreement.  The Tasmanian Government was expected to introduce legislation to the State Parliament by 30 June 2012 to implement the final agreement.

References

External links 
 australia.gov.au - Tasmanian Forests Agreement
 Australian Government Department of Sustainability, Environment, Water, Population and Communities - Tasmanian Forests Intergovernmental Agreement
 Australian Government Department of Agriculture, Fisheries and Forestry - Tasmanian Forests Intergovernmental Agreement
 Tasmanian Forests Agreement (Tasmanian Government website)

Environment of Tasmania
The Wilderness Society (Australia)
Tasmanian forests